In Pas(s)ing is the debut album by guitarist Mick Goodrick. It was recorded in 1978 and released by ECM Records.

Reception
The Allmusic review by Ron Wynn awarded the album 4½ stars calling it "a strong set that had fusion, straight-ahead, and even almost free pieces".

Track listing

Personnel
 Mick Goodrick – guitar
 John Surman – soprano and baritone saxophones, bass clarinet
 Eddie Gómez – bass
 Jack DeJohnette – drums

References

ECM Records albums
1979 albums
Albums produced by Manfred Eicher